Shane Kato Crews is a United States magistrate judge of the United States District Court for the District of Colorado who is the nominee to serve as a United States district judge of the same court.

Early life and education 

Crews is a native of Pueblo, Colorado. He attended Rye High School in Rye, Colorado. He earned a Bachelor of Arts degree from the University of Northern Colorado in 1997 and a Juris Doctor from the University of Arizona in 2000, where he served on the Arizona Law Review.

Career 

In 2000 and 2001, Crews served as a staff attorney for the National Labor Relations Board in Denver. He later worked as a lawyer at Rothgerber Johnson & Lyons LLP in Denver from 2001 to 2008, becoming partner from 2008 to 2010, Mastin Hoffman & Crews LLC from 2011 to 2013, and Hoffman Crews Nies Waggener & Foster LLP from 2013 to 2018.  In private practice, Crews focused on labor, business, and real estate law. He served as a Magistrate Judge of the United States District Court for the District of Colorado since August 3, 2018, where he became the court's first African-American magistrate judge. Crews is the founder of the Federal Limited Appearance Program (FLAP), which provides pro bono legal representation to pro se litigants. Crews also serves on the Board of Directors of CBA CLE, Inc.

Nomination to district court 

On April 29, 2022, U.S. Senators Michael Bennet and John Hickenlooper recommended Sundeep Addy, Gordon Gallagher and Crews for two vacancies on the United States District Court for the District of Colorado. On February 22, 2023, President Joe Biden announced his intent to nominate Crews to serve as a United States district judge of the United States District Court for the District of Colorado. On February 27, 2023, his nomination was sent to the Senate. President Biden nominated Crews to a seat to be vacated by Judge Raymond P. Moore, who will assume senior status on June 20, 2023. His nomination is pending before the Senate Judiciary Committee. Crews is only the third magistrate judge to be nominated for a district court vacancy in Colorado.

References

External links 

Living people
20th-century American lawyers
21st-century American judges
21st-century American lawyers
African-American judges
African-American lawyers
Colorado lawyers
James E. Rogers College of Law alumni
National Labor Relations Board officials
People from Pueblo County, Colorado
United States magistrate judges
University of Arizona alumni
University of Northern Colorado alumni